Reaching is the third and last studio album by the American Christian duo LaRue formed by the siblings Natalie LaRue and Phillip LaRue, released on October 8, 2002.

Critical reception

Steve Losey of AllMusic concludes his review with, "The disc offers tunes that are written from the heart, and Natalie and Philip LaRue wear their hearts on their sleeves."

Mike Rimmer of Cross Rhythms gives the album 10 out of a possible 10 and begins his review with, "Brother and sister act Philip and Natalie LaRue really hit their stride on their third album which must be gratifying considering that they contributed to the songwriting across the whole album."

John DiBiase of esus Freak Hideout gives 4½ out of a possible 5 stars in his review of the album and says, "Reaching is by far this duo's best work where their maturity in songwriting is unmistakable, as they reach out to their peers with a message of love and hope in our Savior."

Track listing

References

External links
Album review at Allmusic

2002 albums
LaRue (band) albums